Alchemy is the debut solo album of Television guitarist Richard Lloyd. It was released in 1979, one year after the breakup of Television and the release of their second album, Adventure. Trouser Press called it "a gem of a solo album."  Its title track was a minor New York FM radio hit.

Lloyd's backing band on the album featured a number of notable New York musicians, including guitarist James Mastro (later of the Bongos), Television bassist Fred Smith and drummer Vinny DeNunzio, formerly of the Feelies.  Producer Michael Young later added guitar and synthesizer overdubs to some tracks, which Lloyd stated that he strenuously opposed at the time.

LP track listing 
All songs written by Richard Lloyd except where noted

Side one
 "Misty Eyes" – 3:51
 "In the Night" – 3:43
 "Alchemy" – 3:50
 "Woman's Ways" – 3:14
 "Number Nine" – 2:51

Side two
 "Should Have Known Better" (Vinny DeNunzio, Lloyd) – 2:52
 "Blue and Grey" – 3:35
 "Summer Rain" – 3:17
 "Pretend" (DeNunzio, Lloyd, James Mastro, Fred Smith) – 4:11
 "Dying Words" – 4:20

Personnel
Richard Lloyd – guitar, vocals, piano, harmonica
Jim Mastro – guitar
Matthew McKenzie – guitar, backing vocals, piano
Fred Smith – bass, backing vocals
Vinny DeNunzio – drums, backing vocals
Michael Young – guitar, synthesizer, arrangements
Technical
George Cornell, Tom Edmunds - assistant engineer
Dan Asher - front cover photography

References

External links
Richard Lloyd Official Website

1979 debut albums
Richard Lloyd (guitarist) albums
Elektra Records albums